Zack Stephenson is an American politician and member of the Minnesota House of Representatives. A member of the Minnesota Democratic–Farmer–Labor Party (DFL), he represents District 35A in the northwestern Twin Cities metropolitan area.

Early life, education, and career
Stephenson was born and raised in Coon Rapids, Minnesota, and graduated from Coon Rapids High School in 2002. He attended Knox College, graduating with a Bachelor of Arts in public policy analysis in 2006, and the University of Chicago Law School, graduating with a Juris Doctor in 2010.

Stephenson is a prosecutor for Hennepin County. He was formerly a staffer for U.S. Senator Amy Klobuchar.

Minnesota House of Representatives
Stephenson was first elected to the Minnesota House of Representatives in 2018. He chairs the Commerce Committee, and also serves on the Climate and Energy Committee and the Elections Committee.

During the 2019 session, Stephenson successfully authored a bill to get rid of Minnesota's "marital rape exception". Before his bill passed, Minnesota law prevented prosecution of rape in certain circumstances when the victim was married to the rapist. With the bill's passage, rapists can be prosecuted regardless of whether they are married to the victim.

Stephenson also successfully authored a provision to take the first steps towards building a new Mississippi River crossing between Dayton, Minnesota, and Ramsey, Minnesota.

In 2020, Stephenson was the chief author of a bill to provide grants to small businesses that were not able to operate due to the COVID-19 pandemic. The bill allocated $62.5 million in grants up to $10,000, with $18 million reserved for microbusinesses, defined as businesses with less than 6 employees. Stephenson's bill passed the House by a margin of 129 to 5 and was unanimously approved in the Senate.

Stephenson's legislative priorities include consumer protection and combating climate change. In 2021, he authored the Energy Conservation and Optimization Act, which significantly expands Minnesota's energy conservation programs. The bill is expected to cut carbon emissions in Minnesota, in particular by incentivizing "fuel switching", whereby utilities offer consumers incentives to switch from less efficient fossil fuels to more efficient electricity. Stephenson also authored the Natural Gas Innovation Act (NGIA), which passed into law with bipartisan support in 2021. NGIA gives Minnesota regulators and utilities new tools to decarbonize the building sector, establishes a new goal to reduce the use of fossil gas, and starts a new regulatory proceeding to plan for further decarbonization.

In 2021, Stephenson also secured passage of Minnesota's Student Borrower's Bill of Rights, which regulates student loan servicers and protects student borrowers from abusive practices. He has also authored legislation to ban price gouging by prescription drug companies.

Personal life
Stephenson and his wife, Austin, have two children. He resides in Coon Rapids, Minnesota. In 2023, he came out as bisexual.

References

External links

 Official House of Representatives website
 Official campaign website

Living people
Democratic Party members of the Minnesota House of Representatives
21st-century American politicians
Year of birth missing (living people)
People from Coon Rapids, Minnesota
American lawyers
Knox College (Illinois) alumni
University of Chicago alumni
LGBT people from Minnesota
Bisexual men